George Blades (born August 27, 1974) is an American former professional boxer who competed from 1999 to 2014 and challenged for the WBO and lineal light heavyweight titles in 2007.

Professional career
On June 16, 2007, Blades fought Zsolt Erdei for the Lineal and WBO Light Heavyweight titles, but lost by eleventh-round technical knockout.

On September 28, 2013, Blades fought Jean Pascal, but lost by fifth-round technical knockout.

On June 21, 2014, Blades fought Chad Dawson, but lost by first-round knockout.

Professional boxing record

References

External links
 

1974 births
Living people
Sportspeople from Orlando, Florida
Boxers from Florida
Light-heavyweight boxers
Cruiserweight boxers
American male boxers